Thomas Stephen Hogan (December 23, 1869 in Chippewa Falls, Wisconsin – September 25, 1957 in Los Angeles, California) was a politician in Montana.

Career
Hogan unsuccessfully ran for the Montana House of Representatives in 1894. While serving as Montana Secretary of State, he was an independent Democratic candidate for governor of Montana in 1900 after not being selected at the party convention, but lost to Joseph Toole. He was later a member of the Montana Senate from 1910 to 1914.

He later built the Yucca Theater in Midland, Texas.

Death
He is buried in El Paso, Texas.

References

External links

Politicians from Chippewa Falls, Wisconsin
Secretaries of State of Montana
Montana state senators
1869 births
1957 deaths
Burials in Texas